The  was an experimental hydroelectric power station located in Kunigami, Okinawa, Japan and operated by the Electric Power Development Company. It was the world’s first pumped-storage facility to use seawater for storing energy. Its maximum output was 30 MW. Construction of the plant started in 1987 and was completed in 1999  at a cost of ¥3.2 billion. It was dismantled in 2016.

Facility 
The power station was a pure pumped-storage facility, using the Pacific Ocean as its lower reservoir, with an effective drop of 136 m and maximum flow of 26 m³/s. Its pipelines and pump turbine were installed underground. Its maximum output was approximately 2.1% of the maximum power demand in the Okinawa Island recorded on August 3, 2009.

The entire inner surface of the reservoir was covered with an impermeable liner to prevent seawater from leaking and damaging the surrounding vegetation.

Fiber-reinforced plastic tubes were adopted for the penstock and the tailrace instead of steel tubes in order to avoid seawater corrosion and adhesion of barnacles. The pump turbine was partially made of stainless steel resistant to seawater.

A 66 kV line connected the power station with the power grid of The Okinawa Electric Power Company.

History 
The power station was a pilot plant funded by the Agency for Natural Resources and Energy and constructed by the Electric Power Development Company. A five-year verification operation was conducted beginning on May 16, 1999. The Japan Society of Civil Engineers presented the company an Outstanding Civil Engineering Achievement Award on May 26, 2000 for its construction of the plant.

The operator could not put the power station into practical use because the demand for electric power in Okinawa had not grown as predicted, and the plant was not profitable as a business. The power plant was dismantled in July 2016.

See also 

 Pumped-storage hydroelectricity

References

External links 
 Okinawa Yanbaru Seawater Pumped Storage Power Station (Official site, in Japanese)
 
 
 

Energy infrastructure completed in 1999
Pumped-storage hydroelectric power stations in Japan
Kunigami, Okinawa
1999 establishments in Japan